The Prosperous Indonesia Party was a political party in Indonesia.  It contested the 2009 elections, but won only 0.3 percent of the vote, less than the 2.5 percent electoral threshold, meaning it was awarded no seats in the People's Representative Council. Following its poor result in the 2009 vote, the party joined nine other smaller parties to form the National Unity Party. The party also attempted to contest the 2014 elections, but failed to fulfill the criteria set by the General Elections Commission, and along with nine other parties who also failed to qualify, decided to merge into the People's Conscience Party (Hanura).

References

Pancasila political parties
Political parties in Indonesia